The 1910 Oklahoma A&M Aggies football team represented Oklahoma A&M College in the 1910 college football season. This was the 10th year of football at A&M and the second under Paul J. Davis. The Aggies played their home games in Stillwater, Oklahoma. They finished the season 3–4.

Schedule

References

Oklahoma AandM
Oklahoma State Cowboys football seasons
Oklahoma AandM Aggies football